Excretion is a process in which metabolic waste 
is eliminated from an organism. In vertebrates this is primarily carried out by the lungs, kidneys, and skin. This is in contrast with secretion, where the substance may have specific tasks after leaving the cell. Excretion is an essential process in all forms of life. For example, in mammals, urine is expelled through the urethra, which is part of the excretory system. In unicellular organisms, waste products are discharged directly through the surface of the cell.

During life activities such as cellular respiration, several chemical reactions take place in the body. These are known as metabolism. These chemical reactions produce waste products such as carbon dioxide, water, salts, urea and uric acid. Accumulation of these wastes beyond a level inside the body is harmful to the body. The excretory organs remove these wastes. This process of removal of metabolic waste from the body is known as excretion.

Green plants produce carbon dioxide and water as respiratory products. In green plants, the carbon dioxide released during respiration gets used during photosynthesis. Oxygen is a by product generated during photosynthesis, and exits through stomata, root cell walls, and other routes. Plants can get rid of excess water by transpiration and guttation. It has been shown that the leaf acts as an 'excretophore' and, in addition to being a primary organ of photosynthesis, is also used as a method of excreting toxic wastes via diffusion. Other waste materials that are exuded by some plants — resin, saps, latex, etc. are forced from the interior of the plant by hydrostatic pressures inside the plant and by absorptive forces of plant cells. These latter processes do not need added energy, they act passively. However, during the pre-abscission phase, the metabolic levels of a leaf are high. Plants also excrete some waste substances into the soil around them.

In animals, the main excretory products are carbon dioxide, ammonia (in ammoniotelics), urea (in ureotelics), uric acid (in uricotelics), guanine (in Arachnida), and creatine. The liver and kidneys clear many substances from the blood (for example, in renal excretion), and the cleared substances are then excreted from the body in the urine and feces.

Aquatic animals usually excrete ammonia directly into the external environment, as this compound has high solubility and there is ample water available for dilution. In terrestrial animals ammonia-like compounds are converted into other nitrogenous materials, i.e. urea, that are less harmful as there is less water in the environment and ammonia itself is toxic. This process is called detoxification.

Birds excrete their nitrogenous wastes as uric acid in the form of a paste. Although this process is metabolically more expensive, it allows more efficient water retention and it can be stored more easily in the egg. Many avian species, especially seabirds, can also excrete salt via specialized nasal salt glands, the saline solution leaving through nostrils in the beak.

In insects, a system involving Malpighian tubules is used to excrete metabolic waste. Metabolic waste diffuses or is actively transported into the tubule, which transports the wastes to the intestines. The metabolic waste is then released from the body along with fecal matter.

The excreted material may be called ejecta. In pathology the word ejecta is more commonly used.

See also

References

External links 

 UAlberta.ca, Animation of excretion
 Brian J Ford on leaf fall in Nature

 
Pharmacology
Digestive system
Metabolism
Physiology